Wattleglen railway station is located on the Hurstbridge line in Victoria, Australia. It serves the north-eastern Melbourne suburb of Wattle Glen, and opened on 25 June 1912 as Balee. It was renamed Wattleglen on 14 August 1922.

History
Wattleglen station opened on 25 June 1912, when the railway line from Eltham was extended to Hurstbridge. Like the suburb itself, the station is named after the wattle trees that are in abundance throughout the area.

In 1968, flashing light signals were provided at the Wilson Road level crossing, located nearby in the down direction of the station. In 1979, the former station building was destroyed by fire. In 1987, boom barriers were provided at the Wilson Road level crossing.

In late 2007, an upgrade to the station and its car park took place, and included installing fencing and sealing the car park.

In 2018, it was announced that the Level Crossing Removal Project will undergo a second upgrade on the Hurstbridge line, which will involve duplicating the track between Wattleglen and Diamond Creek. However, no upgrades were proposed for the station itself. During the 2018/2019 financial year, Wattleglen was the least-patronised station on Melbourne's metropolitan network, with approximately 48,000 passenger movements annually.

In 2020, it was announced that the station car park will be upgraded with 50 new spots, improved CCTV and lighting, as well as more bicycle parking facilities.

Although the railway station signage and the operator's public timetables render the name of the station as two words, sources, such as VicNames, and the operator's internal working timetables, render the official spelling of the station as Wattleglen. It is unclear why the Post Office and suburb were made two words when the Post Office was renamed from Diamond Creek Upper on 1 November 1922, particularly after the station had been renamed (as one word) two and a half months earlier.

Platforms and services
Wattleglen has one platform. It is served by Hurstbridge line trains.

Platform 1:
  all stations and limited express services to Flinders Street; all stations services to Hurstbridge

Transport Links
Panorama Coaches operates one route via Wattleglen station, under contract to Public Transport Victoria:
 : Hurstbridge station – Greensborough station

References

External links
 Victorian Railway Stations gallery
 Melway map at street-directory.com.au

Railway stations in Melbourne
Railway stations in Australia opened in 1912
Railway stations in the Shire of Nillumbik